Onegin is a 1999 British-American romantic drama film based on Alexander Pushkin's 1833 novel in verse Eugene Onegin, co-produced by British and American companies and shot mostly in the United Kingdom. Onegin is Martha Fiennes' directorial debut and stars her brother Ralph Fiennes in the role of Yevgeny (Eugene) Onegin, Liv Tyler as Tatiana, Irene Worth as Princess Alina and Toby Stephens as Lensky. Two other Fiennes siblings were involved in the project: Magnus Fiennes wrote the music and Sophie Fiennes appeared in a minor role.

Plot
In early 19th century Russia, a bored St. Petersburg socialite named Onegin inherits his uncle's estate in the country. There, he meets a neighbouring landowner and aspiring poet, Lensky, and a widowed mother and her two daughters. The poet is engaged to the elder daughter Olga. Her sister, Tatiana (Tanya), writes Onegin a passionate love letter but he turns her down because of her youth and inexperience. He instead dances with her sister, which the jealous Lensky interprets as flirtation, and challenges his friend to a duel. The duel is arranged to take place in a secluded place by a local lake, and unknown to the participants, Tatiana secretly witnesses the duel from a safe distance. She observes Lensky taking the first shot and missing, followed by Onegin taking careful aim and disposing of Lensky with a shot to his opponent's head.

Onegin  departs from his country estate. Six years later, he returns to St Petersburg, he encounters Tatiana, the woman whom he spurned, who is now a woman of refinement and married to a prince. Onegin immediately sees Tanya as desirable, and falls in love with her. He begs her forgiveness for his past behaviour.  Tanya refuses Onegin, explaining to him that he has missed his chance with her; she will be faithful to her husband. He receives her rejection with despair.

Cast

Ralph Fiennes as Yevgeny Onegin 
Liv Tyler as Tatyana Larina
Toby Stephens as Vladimir Lensky
Lena Headey as Olga Larina
Martin Donovan as Prince Nikitin
Alun Armstrong as Zaretsky
Harriet Walter as Madame Larina
Irene Worth as Princess Alina
Jason Watkins as Guillot
Simon McBurney as Triquet 
Gwenllian Davies as Anisia
Margery Withers as Nanya
Geoff McGivern as Andrey Petrovitch

Reception
Onegin received mixed reviews, with praise for its production values and performances, but criticism was leveled at the pacing and writing. Roger Ebert of the Chicago Sun Times said, 'There is a cool, mannered elegance to the picture that I like, but it's dead at its center. There is no feeling that real feelings are at risk here.' Peter Bradshaw of The Guardian wrote, "An earnest but worthwhile attempt to render the Russian writer's tragic and romantic verse novel of 1833 for the screen... we are estranged from the distinctively comic savour of the original. But there still remains much that is worthwhile in this high-minded adaptation." On the more positive side though, Derek Elley of Variety said ' “Onegin” may not appeal to more cynical viewers unprepared to take the emotional leap of faith the movie demands.'

It holds a 'rotten' 48% rating on review aggregate Rotten Tomatoes.

Awards
Martha Fiennes received the Best Director Award at the Tokyo Film Festival and the London Film Critics Circle's award for Best Newcomer. Onegin was also nominated for Best British Film at the British Academy Film Awards and Liv Tyler received the Golden Aries prize for Best Foreign Actress from the Russian Guild of Film Critics.

References

External links
 
 
 
 
 

1999 films
1999 romantic drama films
1990s French-language films
British romantic drama films
American romantic drama films
British independent films
Films directed by Martha Fiennes
Films based on works by Aleksandr Pushkin
Works by Michael Ignatieff
Films based on Russian novels
Romantic period films
Films set in Russia
Films set in the 1820s
Films set in the 1830s
Films shot in England
Films shot in Russia
American independent films
1999 directorial debut films
1999 independent films
1990s English-language films
1990s American films
1990s British films